Westwood Online  may refer to:
Westwood College, a for-profit institution of higher learning in the United States owned by Alta Colleges Inc
Westwood Studios, a computer and video game developer based in Las Vegas, Nevada, United States